Julie Rrap (also known as Julie Parr, Julie Brown or Julie Brown-Rrap, born 1950) is an Australian contemporary artist who was raised on the Gold Coast in Queensland She was born Julie Parr, and reversed her name to express her sense of opposition. Since the mid-1970's she has worked in photography, painting, sculpture, video and performance.  Julie's work expresses her interest in images of the body, especially the female body. She has participated in many exhibitions in Australia and abroad, won many awards, and is represented in major public and private collection in Australia and New Zealand, as well as in Belgium, Netherlands, Switzerland, Italy, France, and the U.S.A.

Biography 
Julie was born in Lismore, New South Wales, Australia. Her family relocated to a small town, Nerang, in the Hinterlands off the Gold Coast, Queensland, which is where she grew up with her sister and brothers who included Mike Parr—an artist with whom she has often collaborated.

In 1971 she completed her Bachelor of Arts Degree at the University of Queensland, Brisbane Australia. In 1974 she continued studies in painting and drawing at the National Art School, East Sydney Technical College (later the City Art Institute), at the University of Sydney.  In 1975 she studied at the Power Worksheds in the Fine Arts Department of the University of Sydney.  In 1976 she studied photo media at the City Art Institute in Sydney.

In Julie Rrap's early career she was running a photographic business with John Delacour who is also a photographer. The business mainly specialised in reproductions of magazines, catalogues, and fine art books.

In 1975 Rrap worked with members of a performance art group (Alex Danko, Mike Parr, Noel Sheridan, Joan Grounds and Tim Burns) from the University of Sydney.

In 1976, Rrap married Bill Brown, a painter.

In the 1980s Rrap focused a lot of her time at universities and art schools such as the Australian Centre for Photography, Alexander Mackie College, Meadowbank, East Sydney Technical College, and Sydney College of the Arts, providing lectures in art and design, painting, photography, and photo-media.

Julie Rrap then lived in France and Belgium between 1986 and 1994.  This helped to ground her work in a more international context, and she exhibited widely during this period. In 1994. Julie returned to Australia.

In 2010 Rrap completed her PhD at Monash University in Melbourne, Australia.

Rrap lives and works in Sydney, and frequently travels between Europe and Australia for exhibitions and the creation of her works.  She continues to work in the Faculty of Arts and Social Sciences at the University of Sydney and leads research and publishes about artists.

Artist career 
In 2018, The University of Sydney School of Architecture, Design and Art published interviews with three Creative Women of Sydney.  In her interview, Rrap noted that  "As a very young artist I was very influenced by the writings of Simone de Beauvoir but as art history did not foreground the work of many women artists it was hard to think at the time of women artists who might influence my work."  She continued "this ‘lack therefore influenced my decision to make art as I felt there was so much missing from that history that could represent female sensibilities." Rrap's artistic career began in the 1970s where she explored painting, performance, photography, sculpture and video.

Rrap’s artistic influences throughout her career have always been the human form and how it is represented in media and society, particularly females in Western Society.  Julie  uses this influence to "…poke fun at the stereotypical representations of women transforming these characters into active agents for change." – Julie Rrap. Using her body, suggestions of the body and representations of the body to complete her work.

Rrap exhibited her first solo exhibition as Julie Brown in 1982, Disclosures: A Photographic Construct held at the Central Street Gallery in Sydney.  This installation was made up of 60 black-and-white and 19 coloured photographs of her own naked body posed to challenge the traditional "male gaze" of the female nude. Some photos showed her in various costumes and various suggestive poses, some cut up and collaged with parts of the body absent. The coloured photos all showed her full nude body.  This work influenced future feminist art. Rrap has continued to use her own body in her works right up to her 2009 video work 360 Degree Self-Portrait.

In her early works, Rrap superimposed photos of herself on images by  Manet, Degas and Rembrandt. In this way she imposed her own image as an artist to disrupt the given models.

In 1994, her work Transpositions covered a wall with 100 boards on which were printed photographs of historical portraits of women.  Each woman's eyes captures the viewer's gaze.  They are no longer the model of the original artist, but women on their own.  This is Rrap's way of stressing the women's lives over art history and the traditional male gaze. This work was a turning point; she stopped using her own body image.  Now she may use skin, leather or other materials  but she still explores the relationship between the female image and how it is portrayed in whatever media.

Julie Rrap is represented by Roslyn Oxley9 Gallery, Sydney and Arc One Gallery, Melbourne

Awards and honours

Rrap has been awarded a number of fellowships, residencies and other recognition, including: 
1986, Cité internationale des arts, Paris, and Power Institute of Fine Arts, University of Sydney 
1989, Fellowship Grant - Australia Council for the Arts 
1995, Multi-Year Fellowship - Australia Council for the Arts
1997, Cité Des Arts, Paris, and AGNSW Studio
1999, Project Grant - Australia Council for the Arts
2001, Hermann's Art Award
2002, Fellowship Grant - Australia Council for the Arts
2007, Project Grant - Australia Council for the Arts
2008, Redlands Art Prize - Mosman Gallery 
2009, Clemenger Contemporary Art Award - National Gallery of Victoria 
2009, National Artists’ Self-portrait Prize - University of Queensland Art Museum, Brisbane

Solo exhibitions 
2004 	Soft Targets, Roslyn Oxley9 Gallery, Sydney
2005   Soft Targets, ARC One gallery, Melbourne, Australia
2005 	Gallery, Victoria, Australia
2006 	Fall Out, Roslyn Oxley9 Gallery, Sydney
2007   Embodied, Newcastle Region Art Gallery, Newcastle
2007 	Body Double, Museum of Contemporary Art, Sydney
2009 	Escape Artist: Castaway, Roslyn Oxley9 Gallery, Sydney
2010   OuterSpace, Arc One Gallery, Melbourne
2010 	360° Self-Portrait, Roslyn Oxley9 Gallery, Sydney
2011 	Julie Rrap: Off Balance, Lismore Regional Gallery, Lismore, NSW
2012 	Loaded, Roslyn Oxley9 Gallery, Sydney
2014 	Rrapture: Julie Rrap, Newcastle Art Gallery, Newcastle

Collections 
Images of works by Julie Rrap can be seen at a number of art gallery websites.  The following collections all hold works by the artist.

 Art Gallery of New South Wales  https://www.artgallery.nsw.gov.au/search/?q=Julie+rrap
 Art Gallery of South Australia  https://www.agsa.sa.gov.au/collection-publications/collection/creators/julie-rrap/5932/
 Art Gallery of Western Australia  (no images available)
 National Gallery of Australia https://artsearch.nga.gov.au/search.cfm
 National Gallery of Victoria  https://www.ngv.vic.gov.au/explore/collection/artist/1369/
 Queensland Art Gallery and Gallery of Modern Art  (no images available.
 University of Melbourne, Vizard Foundation Art Collection  https://www.vizardfoundationartcollection.com.au/the-nineties/explore/julie-rrap/

References

External links 
 Julie Rrap at Arc One Gallery
 
 Roslyn Oxley9 Gallery  https://www.roslynoxley9.com.au/artist/julie-rrap

Living people
1950 births
People from Lismore, New South Wales
20th-century Australian artists
20th-century Australian women artists
21st-century Australian artists
21st-century Australian women artists
University of Queensland alumni
Monash University alumni
Artists from New South Wales